Alyaksandr Bylina (born 26 March 1981) is a Belarusian professional football coach and former player.

Honours
MTZ-RIPO Minsk
Belarusian Cup winner: 2004–05

External links

1981 births
Living people
Belarusian footballers
Association football defenders
FC Energetik-BGU Minsk players
FC Torpedo Minsk players
FC Partizan Minsk players
FC Shakhtyor Soligorsk players
FC Granit Mikashevichi players
FC Belshina Bobruisk players
FC Dnepr Mogilev players
FC Slutsk players
FC Krumkachy Minsk players